Weissia ovalis is a species of moss in the Pottiaceae family.

Distribution 
Weissia ovalis is known only from the islands of Hawaii.

References 

Pottiaceae